Reginald Gleadowe CVO (6 May 1888 – 9 October 1944) was a British teacher and designer who was Slade Professor of Fine Art at Oxford University.

Career
Reginald Morier Yorke Gleadowe was educated at Winchester College, New College, Oxford, and the Slade School of Art. He entered the Civil Service in 1912 as a clerk at the Admiralty. He became private secretary to the Secretary of the Admiralty. During World War I he served as a King's Messenger in the Eastern Mediterranean, with a commission as honorary captain in the Royal Marines.

After the war Gleadowe was assistant to the Director of the National Gallery 1919–23. He then became a master at Winchester College, responsible for art. He remained on the staff until his death but with many outside activities including Slade Professor of Fine Art at Oxford University 1928–33 (a visiting professorship). He exhibited at the Paris International Exhibition of 1937 and at the 1939 New York World's Fair. During World War II he was Admiralty representative on the War Artists' Advisory Committee. Among many other items he designed the Sword of Stalingrad.

Gleadowe was made a Commander of the Royal Victorian Order (CVO) in 1943.

Family
In 1921 Gleadowe married Cecil Rotton. Their daughter Tess, a musician, married the biologist and BBC chairman Michael Swann.

Publications
Ambrose McEvoy (Contemporary British Artists series), Ernest Benn, London, 1924
Albert Rutherston (Contemporary British Artists series), Ernest Benn, London, 1925
Oxford University and the fine arts : Inaugural lecture delivered before the University on 1 February 1928, Clarendon Press, Oxford, 1928
British art : six broadcast talks, BBC, London, 1934

Arms

References
GLEADOWE, Reginald Morier Yorke, Who Was Who, A & C Black, 920–2007; online edn, Oxford University Press, Dec 2012
Mr. R. M. Y. Gleadowe: Former Professor Of Fine Art At Oxford (obituary), The Times, London, 12 October 1944, page 7

1888 births
1944 deaths
20th-century Royal Navy personnel
People educated at Winchester College
Alumni of New College, Oxford
Alumni of the Slade School of Fine Art
Civil servants in the Admiralty
British designers
Commanders of the Royal Victorian Order
Slade Professors of Fine Art (University of Oxford)
Royal Marines personnel of World War I